Silver Lake is a small lake southeast of Stilesville in Delaware County, New York. Roods Creek flows through Silver Lake.

See also
 List of lakes in New York

References 

Lakes of New York (state)
Lakes of Delaware County, New York